Oboh is an African surname. Notable people with this surname include:

 Francisca Oboh Ikuenobe, Nigerian geologist.
 Joseph Oboh Kalu (born 1940), Nigerian boxer.
 Peter Oboh (born 1968), Nigerian boxer.
 Samuel Oboh (born 1971), Canadian architect.
 Solomon Oboh (1989–2013), Nigerian football player.
 Sunday Oboh (born 1987), Nigerian football player.
 Mabel Oboh (born 1964), Nigerian television Broadcaster and Politician.
Josephine Oboh Macleod (born 1965), Artist, Humanitarian, Politician.

See also
 Oboe